York North was a provincial riding in Ontario, Canada, that was represented in the Legislative Assembly of Ontario from 1867 to 2007. The provincial riding was known as York—Mackenzie from 1995 to 1999.

In 2007, the Ontario provincial electoral district was eliminated when it was matched to the redistributed ridings of the federal districts. Julia Munro, who held the York North seat, was re-elected in the new riding of York—Simcoe.

Members of Provincial Parliament

Provincial election results

References

Notes

Citations

External links
 Elections Ontario  1999 results and  2003 results

Aurora, Ontario
Former provincial electoral districts of Ontario
Newmarket, Ontario
Politics of King, Ontario
Politics of Markham, Ontario
Politics of Richmond Hill, Ontario
Politics of Vaughan
Provincial electoral districts of Toronto